Robert Cruce Beardsley (b. 28 January 1942) is an American oceanographer, focused on observational and numerical model studies of wind-, tidal-, and buoyancy-driven currents, mixing, and air-sea forcing on the continental shelf and marginal seas and on the impact of physical processes on biological processes and ecosystem dynamics. He is currently Scientist Emeritus at Woods Hole Oceanographic Institution. 

He is an elected fellow of the American Association for the Advancement of Science.

References

External links
 Curriculum Vitae

1942 births
Living people
American oceanographers
Fellows of the American Association for the Advancement of Science